Larisa Yurkiw (born March 30, 1988) is a Canadian retired World Cup alpine ski racer, specializing in the speed events of downhill and super-G.

Born in Owen Sound, Ontario, Yurkiw made her World Cup debut at Altenmarkt-Zauchensee, Austria, in a downhill event in January 2007. In 2015, she achieved a personal best at Cortina d'Ampezzo, Italy when she placed 2nd in the DH discipline. She went on to achieve three more World Cup podiums.

On December 16, 2009, a crash during a training run at Val d'Isere resulted in an ACL tear, MCL tear, patellar tendon tear and tears in both the lateral and medial miniscus in her left knee. She did not compete on home soil at the 2010 Winter Olympics in Vancouver and Whistler, British Columbia.

Prior to debuting on the world stage, she had much success as a junior ski racer. She made her debut on the Nor-Am Cup on March 10, 2004, held at her home club, Georgian Peaks. From 2005 to 2009, she reached the podium seventeen times, having won gold eight times in all disciplines but slalom. She also had success racing on the GMC Cup (also known as Pontiac Cup), a non-FIS sanctioned ski series that challenges Canada’s most promising skiers. In 2007, Larisa competed on the South American Cup, having posted four top 10 results.

Yurkiw picked up a silver medal at the 2008 FIS Junior World Ski Championships in Formigal, Spain in the combined discipline. From 2006 to 2008, she posted three more top 10 results at this event.

She earned two gold medals at the 2008 Canadian National Championships in Super-G and downhill, and three silver medals in 2009. Since she was still considered a junior in both 2008 and 2009, she went on to become the Canadian National Junior Champion in downhill, giant slalom, and slalom.

Yurkiw announced her retirement on May 11, 2016 via social media, citing her desire to preserve her health. This had come after the best season of her career.

World Cup results

Season standings

Race podiums

 4 podiums – (4 DH)

World Championship results

Olympic results

Equipment and sponsorship
Skis: Rossignol
Bindings: Rossignol
Boots: Rossignol
Poles: Komperdell
Helmet & Goggles: Uvex
Sponsor: Cresco FX

External links

 Larisa Yurkiw World Cup standings at the International Ski Federation

 Rossignol.com – team – Larisa Yurkiw

1988 births
Alpine skiers at the 2014 Winter Olympics
Canadian female alpine skiers
Canadian people of Ukrainian descent
Living people
Olympic alpine skiers of Canada
Sportspeople from Owen Sound